Nicolas Tikhobrazoff (6 June 1946 – 3 October 2022) was a French painter and radio host.

Biography
Born on 6 June 1946 in Paris, Tikhobrazoff was a member of the Conseil national français des arts plastiques.

Tikhobrazoff's style centered around lines, anamorphic effects, and medieval calligraphy. In 2000, he took over Jean-Claude Montagné's Libre journal des collectionneurs on Radio Courtoisie. He was founding president of Artcorusse, a Franco-Russian arts club established in 2007.

References

1946 births
2022 deaths
French painters
Artists from Paris
French people of Russian descent